Joe Danger 2: The Movie is a racing and platform video game developed by Hello Games for the PlayStation 3, Xbox 360, PlayStation Vita and Microsoft Windows. According to Hello Games's managing director, it is "kind of" a sequel to the successful Joe Danger. The game was announced in August 2011 and released for Xbox Live Arcade on 14 September 2012, and 9 October 2012 for PlayStation Network.

Plot 
Joe has gained favor with a movie director in Hollywood and is brought on to perform all the stunts on set. The movie consists entirely of cliche action stunts and so he must perform chase scenes on mini carts, skis, and police bikes.

Development and marketing 
Following the commercial success of Joe Danger, Hello Games began to run job adverts on their website, indicating work on a new project. They began to hire and moved offices towards the end of the year. After an announcement on Hello Games' website the week before, Joe Danger: The Movie, as it was then known, was presented for the first time at Gamescom in Cologne in August 2011. The game will have similar gameplay, but will take place on the set of a film about the daredevil; players will complete objectives unique to each level set by a "mysterious director". IGN noted that the premise is a "good excuse" to parody famous scenes from certain films. Sean Murray told Matt Miller of Game Informer that the game is "kind of" a sequel to Joe Danger, but that he envisioned the game as big enough to dwarf the original. He indicated the game will involve "a load of vehicles" in a variety of locales. At the Penny Arcade Expo, the game was presented on both Microsoft Windows and Xbox 360, which Stephen Totilo of Kotaku interpreted as a broadening of scope for the studio; a promotional image released with the announcement indicated Hello were unsure of how it would be released. The game was eventually released on 14 September 2012.

References 

2012 video games
Indie video games
Linux games
Motorcycle video games
MacOS games
Platform games
PlayStation 3 games
PlayStation Network games
PlayStation Vita games
Racing video games
Video games developed in the United Kingdom
Windows games
Xbox 360 games
Xbox 360 Live Arcade games
Video games with Steam Workshop support
Multiplayer and single-player video games
Split-screen multiplayer games